WAPT (channel 16) is a television station in Jackson, Mississippi, United States, affiliated with ABC. The station is owned by Hearst Television, and maintains studios and transmitter facilities on Channel 16 Way (off MS 18) in southwest Jackson.

History
The station began broadcasting on October 3, 1970, with a rerun of Stagecoach West. Prior to its debut, ABC was relegated to off-hours clearances on NBC affiliate WLBT and CBS affiliate WJTV, save for a brief period from March 1954 until June 1955 when WSLI-TV 12 was a standalone ABC affiliate before combining forces with WJTV, which had aired on channel 25. In fact, by the 1960s, Jackson was one of the largest markets, if not the largest, in the U.S. with only two network stations by the 1960s, even though it had been large enough on paper to support three full network affiliates by the 1950s. It has long been speculated that the Federal Communications Commission (FCC) delayed granting licenses to any potential broadcasters in central Mississippi because of WLBT's blatant bias against African-Americans in news coverage and advocacy against the civil rights movement.

A more likely reason, however, has to do with geography. The Jackson market is a fairly large market, covering a large swath of west-central Mississippi. Jackson had been allocated only two VHF frequencies—channels 3 and 12, occupied by WLBT and WJTV respectively. UHF stations initially didn't cover large stretches of territory very well. Even after the FCC mandated all-channel tuning in 1964, it took a long while for UHF to be a viable option to cover large areas. With Jackson sandwiched between Baton Rouge (channels 2 and 9) to the south and Monroe–El Dorado (channels 8, 10, 11 and 13) to the west with Alexandria (channel 5, southwest), Columbus–Tupelo (channels 2, 4 and 9, northeast), Greenville (channel 6, north), Hattiesburg (channel 7, southeast) and Meridian (channel 11, east) all in close proximity, it is not likely there would have been room to drop in a third VHF allocation in Jackson. In this case, with WAPT taking the ABC affiliation full-time, it took 17 years for Jackson to have television outlets for each of the "Big Three" networks.

WAPT was founded by the American Public Life Insurance Company, an insurer which is still in business today but is now an affiliate of American Fidelity Assurance. American Public Life sold the station to Clay Communications in 1979. As part of the divestiture of the company's newspaper and television properties, on April 30, 1987, Clay sold its WAPT and its four sister television stations—NBC affiliates KJAC-TV (now Fox affiliate KBTV-TV) in Beaumont–Port Arthur, Texas, KFDX-TV in Wichita Falls, Texas, and ABC affiliate WWAY in Wilmington, North Carolina—to New York City-based Price Communications Corporation for $60 million; the sale was approved by the FCC on June 23. Price Communications sold three of its stations—WAPT and then-sister stations WZZM-TV in Grand Rapids, Michigan, and WNAC-TV in Providence, Rhode Island—to the newly founded Northstar Television Group in 1989. Northstar Television was bought out by Argyle Television Holdings II, a company which was formed in late 1994 by a group of managers and executives who left the first incarnation of Argyle Television (the former Times-Mirror Broadcasting) after that company sold all of its stations to New World Communications, in January 1995.

In August 1997, Argyle merged with the Hearst Corporation's broadcasting unit to form what was then known as Hearst-Argyle Television (now Hearst Television after the Hearst Corporation became sole owner of the group in mid-2009).

In 2005, Sacha Baron Cohen appeared as his Borat character in a news interview, while secretly filming a segment for the movie of the same name. After the film's release, Dharma Arthur, a news producer for WAPT, wrote a letter to Newsweek saying that Borat's appearance on the station had led to her losing her job: "Because of him, my boss lost faith in my abilities and second-guessed everything I did thereafter...How upsetting that a man who leaves so much harm in his path is lauded as a comedic genius." Although Arthur has said she was fired from the station, she told the Associated Press that she had resigned. She said that she checked a public relations website that Borat's producers gave her before booking him.

Programming
Syndicated programming on WAPT includes Wheel of Fortune, Judge Judy, Live with Kelly and Ryan, and The Jennifer Hudson Show, among others. Jeopardy!, which is usually paired with Wheel of Fortune in most markets, airs instead on NBC affiliate WLBT; Jackson is one of the few markets where Jeopardy! and Wheel of Fortune are carried on separate stations.

In 1971, WAPT started broadcasting local news, weather, and sports Monday through Friday evenings following the ABC Evening News. The broadcast, which aired at 5:30 p.m., was called The Case-Jefferies Report. A 10:00 p.m. news broadcast was later added. This was later moved to 10:30 when the station began broadcasting the syndicated comedies Mary Hartman, Mary Hartman and Forever Fernwood at 10 instead, as an attempt to counter-program the newscasts on WLBT and WJTV, whose ratings were well ahead of WAPT at the time. Other syndicated programming, such as The Addams Family, Hee Haw Honeys, and The Andy Griffith Show filled that time slot following the cancellations of the comedies set in Fernwood.

In 1971, the station began airing Horrible Movie, a series of horror films airing on Saturday evenings. These were hosted by "Scartisha", a female character played by Annette Stutzman. In 1973, the station's sports anchor, Dick Thames, was killed in a plane crash as he was preparing a news story.

As with ABC's other Mississippi affiliates, WAPT was one of 45 stations that declined to carry NYPD Blue in its first season and stuck to their decision until January 1995. WAPT also preempted "Don't Ask, Don't Tell", an episode of Roseanne which featured a lesbian kissing scene. As standard per Hearst policy, the station has preempted Saving Private Ryan in favor of Far and Away in 2004, and decided not to air any Power Rangers show due to its lack of its educational content.

News operation

WAPT currently broadcasts 26 hours of local newscasts per week with four hours of news aired on weekdays and three hours seen on weekends. On April 30, 2011, WAPT debuted weekend morning newscasts to bookend the weekend editions of Good Morning America.

The station operates a Baron Services VHD 250 Doppler weather radar next to its studios that is known on-air as "Storm Shield 16". There is a live video feed of this radar available on WAPT's website. In addition, all newscasts are streamed online.

Technical information

Subchannels
The station's digital signal is multiplexed:

As of September 1, 2014, WAPT added MeTV (replacing Storm Shield 16), returning the network's programming in the market since WBMS-CA and WXMS-LP ceased operations in 2012 and 2013 respectively. On September 24, 2021, WAPT added The GrioTV and GetTV to its fourth and fifth subchannels, respectively.

Analog-to-digital conversion
WAPT shut down its analog signal, over UHF channel 16, on June 12, 2009, as part of the federally mandated transition from analog to digital television. The station's digital signal remained on its pre-transition UHF channel 21, using PSIP to display WAPT's virtual channel as 16 on digital television receivers.

References

External links

Television channels and stations established in 1970
1970 establishments in Mississippi
APT
ABC network affiliates
MeTV affiliates
GetTV affiliates
Hearst Television